Ujala (Light/Luminosity) is a Bollywood romantic crime film released in 1959, starring Shammi Kapoor, Mala Sinha, Raaj Kumar, Leela Chitnis and Tun Tun. Naresh Saigal was the story writer as well as the director. Ujala features one of the popular Bollywood songs "Jhoomta Masoom, Mast Mahina" played by Shammi Kapoor and Mala Sinha, sung by Manna Dey and Lata Mangeshkar. The film came with a message; "Honesty always triumphs". The film's music was by Shankar–Jaikishan, with lyrics by Shailendra and Hasrat Jaipuri.

Plot
Ramu (Shammi Kapoor), his family consisting of his mother (Leela Chitnis) and three siblings, and his sweetheart Chhabili (Mala Sinha) are poor, but they dream of a better life  and keep trying to achieve it. In the process his childhood friend and villain in the movie Kalu (Raaj Kumar) creates obstacles for his ambitions.

Ramu is dragged into an evil world, where Kalu makes him realize that it is easy money to rob someone; honesty apparently has no value. Ramu gets pulled into this world when his sister meets with a car accident. He needs money for her treatment and she dies due to the lack of it. Ramu now joins Kalu and his gang. Kalu kills one of his gang members who betrays him. Kalu convinces Ramu that he may get blamed for the murder so Ramu goes into hiding. He works for a man making knives from where Kalu steals a silver knife, which belongs to a police officer. This implicates Ramu further where he's again on the run. After a final fight with Kalu, Ramu is able to prove his innocence.

Cast
 Shammi Kapoor as Ramu
 Mala Sinha as Chabeli
 Raaj Kumar as Kalu
 Leela Chitnis as Ramu's mother
 Dhumal as  Bholu
 Kumkum as Kammo
 Ramesh Sinha as Police Inspector
 Shivraj as Acharya

Trivia
Raaj Kumar was unhappy that none of the songs were picturized on him; they were instead picturized on Shammi Kapoor, a rising superstar of the late '50s. To remedy this, Naresh Saigal, the director, created a friendship song between the two male stars "Yaaron Surat Hamari Pe Mat Jaao"  which was sung by Mukesh and Mohammed Rafi, with lyrics by Shailendra.

Music
The film score is composed by the musical duo Shankar–Jaikishan. The lyrics were written by Shailendra and Hasrat Jaipuri.

References

External links
 

1950s Hindi-language films
Films scored by Shankar–Jaikishan
Romantic crime films